Estrées-Saint-Denis is a railway station in the commune of Estrées-Saint-Denis, Oise department, France. The station is served by TER Hauts-de-France trains (Amiens - Compiègne line).

History
Estrées-Saint-Denis was previously a local railway centre, with connections to Clermont-de-l'Oise and to Ormoy-Villers. In 1899, there were 26 passenger trains a day in 5 directions: Compiègne, Verberie, Saint-Just-en-Chaussée, Amiens and Clermont. The station had 80,000 passengers and 90,000 tonnes of goods traffic annually.

The station was also the point of departure for the metre gauge secondary line operated by the Estrées-Saint-Denis - Froissy - Crèvecœur-le-Grand railway company, which linked the three towns via Saint-Just-en-Chaussée. Passenger traffic from Estrées-Saint-Denis on this line ended in 1948.

The station was completely renovated in summer 2008 to simplify the layout of the tracks and to make it accessible to the handicapped.

See also
 List of SNCF stations in Hauts-de-France

References

Railway stations in Oise
Railway stations in France opened in 1880